Yeshivas Kaminetz (also known as Kaminetz Yeshiva) was founded 1945 in Jerusalem by a son and son-in-law of Boruch Ber Leibowitz as is a transplant of Yeshivas Knesses Beis Yitzchak-Kaminetz.

History
Leibowitz was appointed head of Knesses Beis Yitzchak in 1904. During and after World War I it relocated more than once, including to Kaminetz in 1926. Leibowitz headed this yeshiva until his death in 1939. The yeshiva's students dispersed in four groups during World War II. Leibowitz's son-in-law Rabbi Moshe Bernstein, along with his brother-in-law Rabbi Yaakov Moshe Leibowitz, reestablished the school in Jerusalem 
in 1945. Yitzchok Scheiner, grandson-in-law to Boruch Ber, was their successor until his own death in 2021.

References

Orthodox yeshivas in Jerusalem
Jewish Lithuanian history
Jewish Polish history
Lithuanian-Jewish culture in Jerusalem